The Paso de los Libres-Uruguaiana International Bridge is a road and railroad bridge that joins Argentina and Brazil over the Uruguay River, running between Paso de los Libres, Corrientes Province, Argentina, and Uruguaiana, Rio Grande do Sul, Brazil. It measures  in length.

External links

Road-rail bridges
Bridges in Argentina
Bridges in Brazil
Railway bridges in Argentina
Railway bridges in Brazil
Buildings and structures in Corrientes Province
International bridges
Argentina–Brazil border crossings
Bridges over the Uruguay River